François-Séraphin Régnier-Desmarais (13 August 1632, Paris - 6 September 1713, Paris) was a French ecclesiastic, grammarian, diplomat and poet in French, Spanish and Latin.  He also translated Alphonsus Rodriguez's The Practice of Christian Perfection and several works by Anacreon, Homer and Cicero.  He was born in Paris.

Clergy from Paris
1632 births
1713 deaths
Grammarians from France
17th-century French diplomats
Latin–French translators
Greek–French translators
French classical scholars
Spanish–French translators
Members of the Académie Française
17th-century French translators